The men's K-2 1000 metres event was a pairs kayaking event conducted as part of the Canoeing at the 1972 Summer Olympics program.

Medalists

Results

Heats
The 25 crews first raced in three heats on September 5. The top three finishers from each of the heats advanced directly to the semifinals. One was disqualified and the remaining 15 teams were relegated to the repechage heats.

Norway was disqualified for reasons not given in the official report.

Repechages
Taking place on September 7, the top three competitors in each of the three repechages advanced to the semifinals.

Semifinals
The top three finishers in each of the three semifinals (raced on September 8) advanced to the final.

Final
The final was held on September 9.

External links
1972 Summer Olympics official report Volume 3. pp. 489–90. 
Sports-reference.com 1972 K-2 1000 m results.

Men's K-2 1000
Men's events at the 1972 Summer Olympics